This is a list of the paintings (not complete), dating from between 1200 and 1800, housed in the Galleria Nazionale di Capodimonte, Naples, Italy.

Surname A-L

Surname N-Z

External links
 Capodimonte Museum

 
Capodimonte
Lists of paintings